The 2020 USL Championship season was the tenth season of the USL Championship and fourth under Division II sanctioning. This was the second season under the name "USL Championship", having used the name "United Soccer League" through 2018. Real Monarchs were the defending USL Cup champions. The 2020 season saw 35 teams participate in two conferences during the regular season.

On November 8, 2019, Ottawa Fury FC announced that it had suspended operations. The team had received sanctioning from its country's governing body, Canada Soccer, but was denied by U.S. Soccer and the continental governing body of CONCACAF. Additionally, the 2020 season is the first season without Nashville SC. The club's identity transferred to a Major League Soccer team that started play in 2020.

The season was suspended on March 12 due to the COVID-19 pandemic in North America. On June 4, the league announced a return to play on July 11, 2020.

The playoffs began on October 10, and originally scheduled to conclude with the USL Championship Final on November 1. The Final was then cancelled the day before because several Tampa Bay Rowdies players and staff tested positive for COVID-19. The championship would not be awarded.

Real Monarchs were the defending USL Championship champions, but failed to qualify for the playoffs.

Changes from 2019
Expansion clubs
 San Diego Loyal SC

Rebranded clubs
 Bethlehem Steel FC rebranded as Philadelphia Union II
 Swope Park Rangers rebranded as Sporting Kansas City II
 Tulsa Roughnecks FC rebranded as FC Tulsa

Moves
 Ottawa Fury FC franchise rights sold to Miami FC

Departing clubs
 Fresno FC (ceased operations)
 Nashville SC (moved to MLS)

Teams

The following teams are playing in the 2020 USL Championship season:

Competition format

The original divisional alignment was announced on December 19, 2019. The regular season and playoff format was announced on January 9, 2020. The season began on March 6 and was scheduled to conclude on October 17. The 2020 USL Cup Playoffs were expected to begin October 21, and conclude with the final match between November 12–16. The top 10 teams were to make the playoffs in each conference with the same format as in 2019.

Group alignment for resumption of play

The COVID-19 pandemic caused a radical remaking of the competition for 2020. When the season resumed on July 11, the teams were competing in small groups of four or five teams with a geographic component, with the top two teams in each group qualifying for the postseason.

Managerial changes

Group tables

Group A
Group A covers Northwestern states including Northern California.

Group B
Group B covers Southern California, Arizona, and Nevada.

Group C
Group C includes the Rocky Mountain states, New Mexico and El Paso, Texas.

Group D
Group D represents Texas (except El Paso) and Oklahoma.

Group E
Group E covers the Midwestern states.

Group F
Group F includes the Northeastern states.

Group G
Group G includes the northern part of the Southern United States.

Group H
Group H includes the southern and southeasternmost states.

Conference tables

Western Conference

Eastern Conference

Results table

Playoffs

Format
The top two teams in each group qualify for the 2020 Championship Playoffs. They began on the weekend of October 10, featuring a single-elimination, 16-team bracket. Under the revised season format, four group winners in each conference earn hosting rights for the Eastern and Western Conference Quarterfinals. Following the opening round, hosting rights will be determined by regular season record. All playoff matches will stream live on ESPN+ except the Championship final on ESPN.

Bracket

Western Conference Quarterfinals

Eastern Conference Quarterfinals

Western Conference Semifinals

Eastern Conference Semifinals

Western Conference Final

Eastern Conference Final

USL Championship Final 
The Final was cancelled the day before because several Tampa Bay players and staff tested positive for COVID-19. As a result, Phoenix Rising and Tampa Bay were recognized as conference champions, and the final was not played. League officials considered postponing the game, but this would have required quarantining both teams and giving them time for renewed training. The prospect of waiting three to four weeks to play led league officials to simply cancel the game. They also considered awarding Rising the title since it had more points than Tampa Bay, but balked at doing so because Rising earned three points by forfeit after San Diego Loyal walked off the field in protest after Rising's Junior Flemmings directed a homophobic slur at Loyal's Collin Martin.

Average home attendances
Ranked from highest to lowest average attendance.

† One Tacoma Defiance home match took place closed-door due to the COVID-19 pandemic.

Sources: USL Championship Soccer Stadium Digest

Statistical leaders

Top scorers 

Source:

Top assists 

Source:

Shutouts

Source:

Hat-tricks

League awards

Individual awards

All-League Teams

Monthly awards

Weekly awards

References

	

 
2020
2020 in American soccer leagues
Association football events postponed due to the COVID-19 pandemic
Association football events curtailed and voided due to the COVID-19 pandemic